is a 1990 Japanese comedy film directed by Yoji Yamada. It stars Kiyoshi Atsumi as Torajirō Kuruma (Tora-san), and Kumiko Goto as the love interest or "Madonna". Tora-san Takes a Vacation is the forty-third entry in the popular, long-running Otoko wa Tsurai yo series.

Cast
 Kiyoshi Atsumi as Torajirō
 Chieko Baisho as Sakura
 Kumiko Goto as Izumi Oikawa
 Hidetaka Yoshioka as Mitsuo Suwa
 Mari Natsuki as Ayako Oikawa
 Shimojo Masami as Kuruma Tatsuzō
 Chieko Misaki as Tsune Kuruma (Torajiro's aunt)
 Gin Maeda as Hiroshi Suwa
 Hisao Dazai as Boss (Umetarō Katsura)
 Gajirō Satō as Genkō
 Chishū Ryū as Gozen-sama

Critical appraisal
Hidetaka Yoshioka was nominated for Best Supporting Actor and Kumiko Goto for Best Supporting Actress at the Japan Academy Prize for their roles in Tora-san Takes a Vacation, and the previous entry in the series, Tora-san, My Uncle (1989). The German-language site molodezhnaja gives Tora-san Takes a Vacation two and a half out of five stars.

Availability
Tora-san Takes a Vacation was released theatrically on December 22, 1990. In Japan, the film was released on videotape in 1996, and in DVD format in 2005 and 2008.

Bibliography

English

German

Japanese

References

External links
 Tora-san Takes a Vacation at www.tora-san.jp (official site)

1990 films
Films directed by Yoji Yamada
1990 comedy films
1990s Japanese-language films
Otoko wa Tsurai yo films
Shochiku films
Films set in Nagoya
Films with screenplays by Yôji Yamada
Japanese sequel films
1990s Japanese films